The 2009 Kansas State Wildcats baseball team represented Kansas State University in the NCAA Division I college baseball season of 2009. It was the 109th baseball season in school history.

The team's head coach was Brad Hill who was in his sixth season at Kansas State. He was previously the head coach at Central Missouri State before coming to Manhattan in 2004.

Kansas State made the NCAA Tournament for the first time in school history. The team finished the season by setting the school’s record for wins, eight more than the previous school record of 35 in 1976.

Preseason 
The Wildcats, who recorded the most conference victories and its highest conference finish (tied for sixth) since 2002, return five pitchers who combined for 21 starts last season. The Wildcats will have junior A.J. Morris and seniors Lance Hoge and Todd Vogel, while sophomore Thomas Rooke, who tied for fifth in school history with 25 appearances out of the bullpen last year, could be called upon to start some games this year for the Wildcats.

Offensively, K-State returns four of its top five hitters from a year ago, including junior infielder Justin Bloxom and senior outfielder Dane Yelovich. Bloxom led K-State in virtually every offensive category last season, including batting average (.288), hits (63), RBI (49), triples (2), total bases (105), total plate appearances (252), at bats (219), games played (58) and games started (57). Yelovich finished with a .286 average and stole 18 bases, good for fourth in the Big 12 Conference.

Alongside Bloxom in the infield is expected to be sophomore Carter Jurica at second base, converted outfielder Jason King at third, while senior Drew Biery will man shortstop for the second-consecutive year.

The outfield will feature Yelovich in center field, while fellow senior, Jordan Cruz, will return to right field after beginning the 2008 season as the starter. Left field will be a battle between junior Adam Muenster and true freshman Nick Martini. Muenster, who will be a switch-hitter this season, could also see time at second base.

Rob Vaughn, a two-year starter at catcher, returns for his senior campaign, while a pair of juniors, Daniel Dellasega and David Masters will also see playing time behind the plate.

Season

Regular season 
Head Coach Brad Hill, in his sixth season at K-State, earned Big 12 Coach of the Year honors as he guided Kansas State to a 39-win season, including 14 conference victories to finish fourth in the league, all school bests. The team also earned their highest ranking in school history as they were number 10 in the Baseball America Top 25 earlier in the season. A.J. Morris won Big 12 pitcher of year, the first Wildcat ever to do so. Morris finished the regular season as the Big 12 leader in both wins (12) and ERA (1.61). He was also first in innings pitched (100.2), third in opponent batting average (.203) and tied for fifth in strikeouts (91). Morris became the first player in school history to be named a semifinalist for the Dick Howser Trophy. Brad Hill became the first Kansas State coach since Mike Clark in 1990 to be named conference coach of the year.

Carter Jurica earned second-team accolades from the coaches after leading the conference’s top hitting team with a .366 average, which was third in the Big 12 individually. Jurica also finished the regular season third in stolen bases (21), fourth in hits (78), and fifth in both runs scored (57) and on-base percentage (.442). Seniors Drew Biery and Jordan Cruz, junior Justin Bloxom, sophomore Jason King and freshman Nick Martini were each named honorable mention All-Big 12.

Kansas State was tied for 12th nationally with 39 wins. Kansas State has recorded 136 steals this season, the second-most in school history. The Wildcats have recorded 20 triples this season, which are tops in the Big 12, and the most by a K-State team since 1997.

Conference tournament 
The Wildcats earned a birth in the Big 12 baseball tournament for the second year in a row. The tournament was held at AT&T Bricktown Ballpark in Oklahoma City Oklahoma.

Kansas State first beat Kansas by a score of 5–4. They then beat Baylor, 9–4. They faced Texas next for the right to play in the tournament championship. The Wildcats fell short, 2–4.

NCAA tournament 
The Wildcats earned their first ever berth in the NCAA baseball Tournament. They competed in the Houston Regional, with Rice University playing host, at Reckling Park. The other teams were Rice, Xavier, and Sam Houston State. The lost the regional final against Rice.

Roster

Coaches 
{| border="0" style="width:100%;"
|-
| valign="top" |

Schedule 

|-  style="text-align:center; background:#dfd;"
| 1 || February 20 || at Houston || 16–2 || Cougar Field || Morris || Musick ||  ||  1,231|| 1–0 || 0–0
|-  style="text-align:center; background:#dfd;"
| 2 || February 21 || at Houston || 9–2 || Cougar Field || Hoge || Ray ||   || 1,165 || 2–0 || 0–0
|-  style="text-align:center; background:#fdd;"
| 3 || February 22 || at Houston || 2–3 (10) || Cougar Field || Dempsay || Marshall ||  || 1,143 || 2–1 || 0–0
|-  style="text-align:center; background:#dfd;"
| 4 || February 26 || vs Pacific || 7–4 || Tony Gwynn Stadium || Morris || Holscher ||   || 73 || 3–1 || 0–0
|-  style="text-align:center; background:#dfd;"
| 5 || February 27 || vs Nevada || 10–2 || Tony Gwynn Stadium || Hoge || Bautista ||   || 71 || 4–1 || 0–0
|-  style="text-align:center; background:#fdd;"
| 6 || February 28 || vs #11 San Diego || 1–2 || Tony Gwynn Stadium || DeNault || Applegate ||   || 117 || 4–2 || 0–0
|-  style="text-align:center; background:#dfd;"
| 7 || March 1 || at San Diego State || 5–4 (10) || Tony Gwynn Stadium || Applegate || Skipper ||   || 419 || 5–2 || 0–0
|-  style="text-align:center; background:#dfd;"
| 8 || March 3 || Creighton || 12–1 || Tointon Family Stadium || Morris || Dufek ||  || 730 || 6–2 || 0–0
|-  style="text-align:center; background:#dfd;"
| 9 || March 6 || Niagara || 12–1  || Tointon Family Stadium || Hoge || Kellar ||   || 1,252 || 7–2 || 0–0
|-  style="text-align:center; background:#dfd;"
| 10 || March 6 || Niagara || 9–8 || Tointon Family Stadium || Daniel || Morari ||   || 1,252 || 8–2 || 0–0
|-  style="text-align:center; background:#dfd;"
| 11 || March 7 || Niagara || 12–2 || Tointon Family Stadium || Bahramzadeh || Candelmo ||   || 916 || 9–2  || 0–0
|-  style="text-align:center; background:#dfd;"
| 12 || March 8 || Niagara  || 15–1 || Tointon Family Stadium || Vogel || Sikorski  ||   || 397  || 10–2 || 0–0
|-  style="text-align:center; background:#dfd;"
| 13 || March 10 || at #4 Arizona State || 6–2  || Surprise Stadium || Morris || Leake || Allen || 4,375 || 11–2 || 0–0
|-  style="text-align:center; background:#fdd;"
| 14 || March 11 || at #4 Arizona State || 1–12 || Surprise Stadium || Spence || Hoge || Swagerty || 5,770 || 11–3 || 0–0
|-  style="text-align:center; background:#dfd;"
| 15 || March 13 || Butler || 8–4 || Tointon Family Stadium || Rooke || Sokolowski ||   || 514 || 12–3 || 0–0
|-  style="text-align:center; background:#dfd;"
| 16 || March 14 || Butler || 14–2 || Tointon Family Stadium  || Bahramzadeh || Wagoner  ||   || 888 || 13–3  || 0–0
|-  style="text-align:center; background:#dfd;"
| 17 || March 14 || Butler || 15–3 || Tointon Family Stadium  || Vogel || Ochs  ||   || 888 || 14–3 || 0–0
|-  style="text-align:center; background:#dfd;"
| 18 || March 15 || Butler || 13–2 || Tointon Family Stadium  || Morris || Sinkiewicz ||   || 661 || 15–3 || 0–0
|-  style="text-align:center; background:#dfd;"
| 19 || March 17 || Texas San Antonio || 5–4 || Tointon Family Stadium || Applegate || Selsor || Allen|| 1,074 || 16–3 || 0–0
|-  style="text-align:center; background:#dfd;"
| 20 || March 18 || Texas San Antonio || 5–4 || Tointon Family Stadium|| Allen || Clarke ||   || 685 || 17–3 || 0–0
|-  style="text-align:center; background:#dfd;"
| 21 || March 20 || #13 Oklahoma || 9–1 || Tointon Family Stadium || Morris || Doyle ||   || 818 || 18–3 || 1–0
|-  style="text-align:center; background:#fdd;"
| 22 || March 21 || #13 Oklahoma || 11–12 || Tointon Family Stadium || Seng || Marshall ||   || 1,499  || 18–4 || 1–1
|-  style="text-align:center; background:#fdd;"
| 23 || March 22 || #13 Oklahoma || 4–29 || Tointon Family Stadium || Rocha || Bahramzadeh ||   || 1,101 || 18–5 || 1–2
|-  style="text-align:center; background:#dfd;"
| 24 || March 24 || Northwestern || 4–3 || Tointon Family Stadium || Rooke || Jensen ||   || 672 || 19–5 || 1–2
|-  style="text-align:center; background:#dfd;"
| 25 || March 25 || Northwestern || 12–8 || Tointon Family Stadium || Hobbs || Morgan ||   || 534 || 20–5 || 1–2
|-  style="text-align:center; background:#dfd;"
| 26 || March 27 || at #8 Baylor || 7–1 || Baylor Ballpark || Morris || Volz ||   || 2,642 || 21–5  || 2–2
|-  style="text-align:center; background:#fdd;"
| 27 || March 28 || at #8 Baylor || 2–3 || Baylor Ballpark || Verrett || Hoge || Miller || 2,687 || 21–6 || 2–3
|-  style="text-align:center; background:#fdd;"
| 28 || March 29 || at #8 Baylor || 6–7 || Baylor Ballpark || Kempf || Hunter || Pinckard || 2,657 || 21–7 || 2–4
|-  style="text-align:center; background:#fdd;"
| 29 || April 1 || at Creighton || 1–5 || Creighton Sports Complex || Nihsen || Daniel ||   || 633 || 21–8 || 2–4
|-  style="text-align:center; background:#dfd;"
| 30 || April 3 || at Nebraska || 15–1 || Haymarket Park || Hoge || Roualdes ||   ||   || 22–8 || 3–4
|-  style="text-align:center; background:#dfd;"
| 31 || April 3 || at Nebraska || 9–3 || Haymarket Park || Morris || Rose ||   || 4,634 || 23–8 || 4–4
|-  style="text-align:center; background:#dfd;"
| 32 || April 4 || at Nebraska || 5–3 || Haymarket Park || Vogel || Hauptmann || Allen || 1,594 || 24–8 || 5–4
|-  style="text-align:center; background:#fdd;"
| 33 || April 9 || #15 Texas A&M || 2–4 || Tointon Family Stadium || Raley || Allen ||   || 713 || 24–9 || 5–5
|-  style="text-align:center; background:#dfd;"
| 34 || April 10 || #15 Texas A&M || 6–4 || Tointon Family Stadium || Morris || Wilson || Rooke || 1,247 || 25–9 || 6–5
|-  style="text-align:center; background:#dfd;"
| 35 || April 11 || #15 Texas A&M || 4–3 || Tointon Family Stadium || Rooke || Fleece ||   || 1,746 || 26–9 || 7–5
|-  style="text-align:center; background:#dfd;"
| 36 || April 14 || Wichita State || 13–5 || Tointon Family Stadium || Marshall || Maldonado ||   || 2,416 || 27–9 || 7–5
|-  style="text-align:center; background:#dfd;"
| 37 || April 15 || at Wichita State ||4–3   || Eck Stadium || Daniel || Flynn || Rooke || 5,586 || 28–9 || 7–5
|-  style="text-align:center; background:#fdd;"
| 38 || April 17 || Missouri || 3–4  || Tointon Family Stadium || Gibson  || Rooke  ||   || 3,008 || 28–10 || 7–6
|-  style="text-align:center; background:#fdd;"
| 39 || April 18 || Missouri || 6–11 || Tointon Family Stadium || Fick || Hunter ||   || 1,955 || 28–11 || 7–7
|-  style="text-align:center; background:#dfd;"
| 40 || April 19 || Missouri || 11–5 || Tointon Family Stadium || Marshall || Tepesch || Rooke  || 1,440 || 29–11 || 8–7
|-  style="text-align:center; background:#dfd;"
| 41 || April 24 || at #2 Texas || 4–2 || UFCU Disch-Falk Field || Morris || Wood ||   || 5,473 || 30–11 || 9–7
|-  style="text-align:center; background:#dfd;"
| 42 || April 25 || at #2 Texas || 5–4 (12) || UFCU Disch-Falk Field || Applegate || Jungmann ||   || 6,344 || 31–11 || 10–7
|- style="text-align:center;"
| 43 || April 26 || at #2 Texas || 6–6 || UFCU Disch-Falk Field ||   ||   ||   || 5,552 || 31–11–1 || 10–7–1
|-  style="text-align:center; background:#dfd;"
| 44 || April 28 || North Dakota || 10–2 || Tointon Family Stadium || Hunter || Biermaier ||   || 1,149 || 32–11–1 || 10–7–1
|-  style="text-align:center; background:#dfd;"
| 45 || April 29 || North Dakota || 22–1 || Tointon Family Stadium || Daniel || Baumgartner ||   || 988 || 33–11–1 || 10–7–1
|-  style="text-align:center; background:#dfd;"
| 46 || May 1 || at #26 Oklahoma State || 5–3 || Allie P. Reynolds Stadium || Hoge || Oliver || Rooke ||   || 34–11–1 || 11–7–1
|-  style="text-align:center; background:#dfd;"
| 47 || 1 May|| at #26 Oklahoma State || 4–3 (6) || Allie P. Reynolds Stadium || Morris || Lyons ||   || 276 || 35–11–1 ||  12–7–1
|-  style="text-align:center; background:#dfd;"
| 48 || May 4 || BYU || 9–8 (10) || Tointon Family Stadium || Rooke || Muir ||   || 1,197 || 36–11–1 || 12–7–1
|-  style="text-align:center; background:#dfd;"
| 49 || May 5 || BYU || 11–3 || Tointon Family Stadium || Daniel || Toole  ||   || 1,640 || 37–11–1  || 12–7–1
|-  style="text-align:center; background:#fdd;"
| 50 || May 8 || Texas Tech || 0–6 || Tointon Family Stadium  || Karns || Morris  ||   || 3,651 || 37–12–1 || 12–8–1
|-  style="text-align:center; background:#fdd;"
| 51 || May 9 || Texas Tech || 6–12 || Tointon Family Stadium  || Ramos || Hoge ||   || 2,577 || 37–13–1 || 12–9–1
|-  style="text-align:center; background:#dfd;"
| 52 || May 10 || Texas Tech || 9–5 || Tointon Family Stadium  || Vogel || Head  ||   || 1,263 || 38–13–1 || 13–9–1
|-  style="text-align:center; background:#dfd;"
| 53 || May 15 || Kansas || 4–1  || Tointon Family Stadium || Morris || Hall  ||   || 4,280 || 39–13–1  || 14–9–1
|-  style="text-align:center; background:#fdd;"
| 54 || May 16 || at Kansas || 3–9 || Hoglund Ballpark || Walz || Hoge ||   || 2,438 || 39–14–1 || 14–10–1
|-  style="text-align:center; background:#fdd;"
| 55 || May 17 || at Kansas || 7–17 (7) || Hoglund Ballpark || Ridenhour || Vogel  ||   || 2,639 || 39–15–1 || 14–11–1
|-

|-  style="text-align:center; background:#dfd;"
| 1 || May 20 || #24 Kansas || 5–4 || Bricktown Ballpark || Allen || Selik ||   || 4,129 || 40–15–1  || 1–0
|-  style="text-align:center; background:#dfd;"
| 2 || May 21 || Baylor || 9–4 || Bricktown Ballpark || Morris || Kempf ||   || 4,583 || 41–15–1 || 2–0
|-  style="text-align:center; background:#fdd;"
| 3 || May 23 || #5 Texas || 2–4  || Bricktown Ballpark || Jungmann || Applegate ||  || 5,720 || 41–16–1 ||  2–1
|-

|-  style="text-align:center; background:#dfd;"
| 1 || May 29 || Xavier || 16–8 || Reckling Park || Hoge || Richard ||   || 2,893 || 42–16–1  || 1–0
|-  style="text-align:center; background:#dfd;"
| 2 || May 30 || #6 Rice || 7–6 || Reckling Park || Morris || Berry||   || 4,169 || 43–16–1  || 2–0
|-  style="text-align:center; background:#fdd;"
| 3 || May 31 || #6 Rice || 0–8 || Reckling Park || Wall  || Vogel ||   || 3,298 || 43–17–1  || 2–1
|-  style="text-align:center; background:#fdd;"
| 4 || June 1 || #6 Rice || 4–13 || Reckling Park || Reckling  || Rooke ||   || 4,589 || 43–18–1  || 2–2
|-

|-
|

Awards and honors

Wildcats in the 2009 MLB Draft 
The following members of the 2009 Kansas State Wildcats baseball team were drafted in the 2009 MLB Draft.

*2009 Signee

See also 
 Kansas State University
 Kansas State Wildcats
 Kansas State Wildcats baseball
 Tointon Family Stadium
 Brad Hill

References

External links 
 Official Kansas State Wildcats baseball page

Kansas State Wildcats baseball seasons
Kansas State Wildcats Baseball Team, 2009
Kansas State
2009 in sports in Kansas